San Diego Miramar College (Miramar) is a public community college in San Diego, California. It is part of the San Diego Community College District and the California Community Colleges System.

Notable alumni
Brian Awadis (FaZe Rug): YouTube personality
Phil Esbenshade (Phil E.): Professional Skateboarder / Musician/ Attorney
Jerry Sanders: San Diego Mayor

References

External links
Official website

Universities and colleges in San Diego
California Community Colleges
Educational institutions established in 1969
Schools accredited by the Western Association of Schools and Colleges
1969 establishments in California
Two-year colleges in the United States